OCP may refer to:

Computer-related
 Open/closed principle
 Open Compute Project, open-source hardware design for scale-out data centers
 Open Container Project, application containers for ease of portability
 Open Core Protocol
 OpenShift Container Platform, an on-premises version of OpenShift from Red Hat
 Oracle Certified Professional, a designation of the Oracle Certification Program
 Order code processor, the central processing unit in ICL 2900 and other computers
 Overcurrent Protection
 Oxford Concordance Program

Fiction
 Omni Consumer Products, fictional megacorporation in the RoboCop media franchise
 Outside Context Problem, a concept in Iain  M. Banks's The Culture novels

Organizations
 Office Chérifien des Phosphates, national Moroccan phosphates company
 Omni Consumer Products (company), manufacturer of products based on fictional movie items
 Onchocerciasis Control Programme, a global effort to control the disease Onchocerciasis
 Opera Company of Philadelphia
 Oregon Catholic Press, the largest English-language publisher of contemporary Catholic liturgical music
 Portuguese Chamber Orchestra

Politics and policy
 Official Community Plan, in Canada, a comprehensive municipal plan
 One-child policy, in the People's Republic of China

Science and technology
 Obligatory Contour Principle, a principle of phonological theory
 Octacalcium phosphate, a biomineral precursor
 Ocular cicatricial pemphigoid or mucous membrane pemphigoid
 Open circuit potential, in electrochemistry, an electric potential measured at zero net current
 Optimal Control Problem
 Oral contraceptive pill, in birth control
 Orange Carotenoid Protein, involved in photoprotection against light stress in diverse cyanobacteria
 Overall coagulation potential, a parameter of the overall hemostasis potential test
 Overcurrent protection in power supply

Other
 OCP (film), a performance video project by Mitch Stratten
 Ocean Park station, an MTR station in Hong Kong
 Ochre Coloured Pottery culture, a Bronze Age culture in the Yamuna-Ganga region of India
 Operational Camouflage Pattern, a camouflage pattern used by the U.S. military
 Oatmeal Creme Pie, a snack cake produced by Little Debbie consisting of two soft oatmeal cookies with a cream filling

See also
 Open Core Protocol International Partnership Association